The David O. McKay Library's Special Collections and Archives is part of the many collections housed within the David O. McKay Library. Special Collections and Archives houses items unique to Brigham Young University - Idaho's history and campus curriculum, the history of the Upper Snake River Valley, and changes in record-keeping. Collections range from prehistoric artifacts demonstrating early writing, to primary source documents detailing pioneer history in Rexburg, to more modern electronic records documenting campus events.

Collections

Campus History

Manuscripts

Special Collections

References 

Brigham Young University